Ingardis or Ingard of Denmark (died 1236) was a Duchess of Pomerania by marriage to Casimir II, Duke of Pomerania. She was regent during the minority of her son Wartislaw III, Duke of Pomerania in 1219-1226. 

Ingardis was from Denmark. Traditionally, she has often been claimed to be a princess of Denmark. 

She married Casimir II in 1210. Together, they had a son, Wartislaw III who would succeed as duke of Pomerania-Demmin, and a daughter, Elisabeth.

Ingardis ruled Pomerania-Demmin in place of young Wartislaw from Casimir's death 1219 until 1226. At that time, Pomerania-Demmin as well as the other part duchy Pomerania-Stettin were under Danish overlordship, which diminished after the 1227 Battle of Bornhöved and was finally dismissed when Wartislaw successfully countered a Danish expedition in 1234 with his Lübeck allies.

References

 Dietmar Lucht: Herzog Wartislaw III. von Pommern. In: Baltische Studien, Neue Folge Bd. 53, 1967, S. 13–15.
 Edward Rymar: Rodowód Książąt pomorskich, Szczecin 2005, S. 151–154.

13th-century women rulers
Danish princesses
Pomeranian nobility
1236 deaths